The St. Joe Blacksnakes, in Saint Joseph, Missouri, were a member of the American Association of Independent Professional Baseball.

On December 16, 2005 the team announced that the primary owner would be Van Schley and that the field manager would be Chris Carminucci.  On December 27, St. Joe acquired its first player — outfielder Jake Whitesides from New Jersey.  On Tuesday January 10, pitchers Josh Jarman and Jason Navarro and infielder Josh Shaffer, all of whom played in the Golden Baseball League during the 2005 season, were added to the team.

The team announced its name and logo on February 10, 2006, becoming the Blacksnakes. St. Joseph played its first home game against the Sioux Falls Canaries on May 19, 2006, at Phil Welch Stadium.

The Blacksnakes played in the Northern Division both years.  They finished third in each half of the 2006 season with a 2622 record in the first half and 23-24 in the second half, for an overall record of 4946 (.516) for the season.  Attendance in that inaugural season was 59,107, for an average of 1,180.  The team's manager in that first season was Chris Carminucci.

"Dirty" Al Gallagher was signed to manage the team for the 2007 season.  The Blacksnakes finished fifth (last) in each half of the season, going a league-worst 3462 (.354) for the entire season.  Attendance was a league-worst 30,244 (643 per game average).  Following the addition of two new teams to the league and the cease of operations of the Coastal Bend Aviators, the Blacksnakes disbanded after the 2007 season.

External links
St. Joe Blacksnakes Guide on aabfan.com

Defunct American Association of Professional Baseball teams
Defunct baseball teams in Missouri
Defunct independent baseball league teams
Sports clubs disestablished in 2007
Baseball teams established in 2006